Events during the year 1929 in Italy.

Incumbents
 Monarch: Victor Emmanuel III
 Prime Minister: Benito Mussolini

Events
11 February – The Lateran Treaty, an agreement between the Kingdom of Italy and the Holy See, is signed in Rome. Due to The Concordat of 1929, It made Catholicism the Sole religion of Italy this was the case until 1984.  
date unknown – The first of the Saccopastore skulls is discovered.

Births 
3 January –  Sergio Leone, film director (died 1989)
11 January – Nicoletta Orsomando, continuity announcer (died 2021)
26 February – Paolo Ferrari, actor (died 2018)
15 March – Antonietta Stella, operatic soprano (died 2022)
8 July – Milena Greppi, hurdler
4 August - Gabriella Tucci, operatic soprano (died 2020)
4 November – Riccardo Ehrman, journalist (died 2021)

Deaths
12 April – Enrico Ferri,  Italian criminologist (born 1856)
 9 November – Guido Keller, aviator and political activist

References

 
1920s in Italy
Years of the 20th century in Italy
Italy
Italy